Vélez Club de Fútbol is a Spanish football team based in Vélez-Málaga, in the autonomous community of Andalusia. Founded on 22 September 1922 it plays in  Segunda División RFEF – Group 4, holding home matches at Estadio Vivar Téllez, with a capacity of 2,100 seats.

History
The club was founded in 1922 and officially registered in the South Regional Federation in 1940, spending its first years in provincial tournaments. 

On 17 June 2019 Vélez appointed Francis Parrado as a head coach for the 2019–20 season in Tercera División.

Club background
Sociedad Deportiva Vélez Fútbol Club (1922–1936)
Vélez Fútbol Club (1940–1958)
Club Deportivo Veleño Educación y Descanso (1958–1968)
Club Deportivo Veleño (1968–1976)
Vélez Club de Fútbol (1976–)

First-team squad
Updated 21 August 2022.
Players listed on the First Team page on Vélez CF's club profile.

Season to season

2 seasons in Segunda División B
1 season in Segunda División RFEF
38 seasons in Tercera División

Famous players
 Fernando Hierro (Youth Academy)
 Angelo
 Alfonso Vera
 Thomas Gant

References

External links
Official website 
Football team profile 

Football clubs in Andalusia
Association football clubs established in 1941
1941 establishments in Spain
Province of Málaga
Vélez CF